Madeleine Delbrêl (1904–1964) was a French Catholic author, poet, and mystic, whose works include The Marxist City as Mission Territory (1957), The Contemporary Forms of Atheism (1962), and the posthumous publications We, the Ordinary People of the Streets (1966) and The Joy of Believing (1968).  She came to the Catholic faith after a youth spent as a atheist.  She has been cited by Cardinal Roger Etchegaray as an example for young people to follow in "the arduous battle of holiness." Madeleine died unexpectedly from a brain hemorrhage in 1964.

Early life
Madeleine Delbrel was born in Mussidan, France. Her father was of an artistic disposition, and Madeleine inherited his interest in and talent for writing. Throughout her childhood, she lived in several different places, and was never able to feel at home or make friends anywhere. Her parents were not religious, so Madeleine was an atheist by age of fifteen, experiencing life as absurd. At seventeen she wrote a tract titled: "God is dead--long live!" which expresses her view that death is the only certainty in life.
Consequently, she lived life without any regard to middle-class values, writing and illustrating poetry, studying philosophy and art at the Sorbonne in Paris, designing her own fashions, and being one of the first women of her set to cut her hair short.
However, when her fiancé suddenly decided to join the Dominicans and her father went blind, her life fell apart. At the same time she began to notice that life did not seem absurd to her Christian friends, who still enjoyed life as much as she did. Suddenly, God's existence did not seem a complete impossibility anymore. She decided to kneel and pray, and also remembered Teresa of Avila's recommendation to silently think of God for five minutes each day.
Madeleine called the year of 1924 the year of her conversion. For in praying she found God — or as she felt, he found her. To her he was someone to love just like any other person. At first she considered taking the veil and entering the Carmelite order, but then felt called upon to be in touch with people and help them lead happier lives. She joined the Girl Scouts, then led a group of women in Ivry, a small working-class town, with the goal of simply caring, consoling, aiding, and establishing good contact with the people. She then took a degree in Social Studies and was employed by the city government of Ivry, where she worked throughout World War II and thereafter.

There is a movement underway advocating for her beatification. The diocese of Créteil opened her cause in 1993. Pope Francis signed a decree that Madeleine Delbrel had lived a life of heroic virtue on January 26, 2018 with the title of Venerable.

Further information may be found on her French language Wikipedia entry

References

External links
 Madeleine Delbrêl 

Converts to Roman Catholicism from atheism or agnosticism
French Roman Catholics
Roman Catholic writers
1904 births
1964 deaths
20th-century French women writers